The 189th Airlift Squadron (189 AS) is an inactive unit of the Idaho Air National Guard.  It was last assigned to the 124th Wing located at Gowen Field Air National Guard Base, Boise, Idaho.  Following the BRAC 2005 the unit was inactivated on 18 October 2009.

History

The 189th AS was activated on 1 September 1996 at Gowen Field ANGB as part of the 124th Wing.  It was a tactical airlift squadron, equipped with Lockheed C-130E Hercules transports.

Prior to its activation as a squadron in 1995, the unit was initially formed on 1 April 1984 as the 189th Tactical Reconnaissance Training Flight.  Its mission was a Formal Training Unit (FTU) for aircrews being assigned to the 124th Tactical Reconnaissance (later Fighter) group flying RF-4C Phantom II reconnaissance and later F-4G Phantom II electronic warfare aircraft.  On 16 March 1992 it was re-designated as the 189th Fighter Flight.  The flight used 190th TFS/FS aircraft for its training mission.

With the retirement of the F-4Gs in 1995, the status of the unit was changed from a flight to a squadron, and it received C-130E aircraft for operational missions.  The 189th supported countless deployments all over the world in support of the U.S. Southern Command, Operation Allied Force, Operation Southern Watch, Operation Enduring Freedom and Operation Iraqi Freedom. They also responded to winter weather disasters New Mexico and provided humanitarian support for Hurricanes Katrina and Rita.

The Airlift Squadron's awards include the Governor's Outstanding Unit Citation 1997, 1999, and 2005 as well as the Adjutant General Award 1998.

The 189th Airlift Squadron was inactivated as a result of the 2005 Base Realignment and Closure Act on 18 October 2009. Many of the members who were part of the squadron were absorbed within the wing.

References

 Inactivation of 189th Airlift Squadron
 History of the Idaho Air National Guard 
 Rogers, B. (2006). United States Air Force Unit Designations Since 1978.

External links

Military units and formations disestablished in 2009
0189
Military units and formations in Idaho